Aria Air Flight 1525 was a scheduled Iranian domestic flight which crashed on landing at Mashhad International Airport, Mashhad, Iran, on 24 July 2009.

Aircraft

The aircraft involved was an Ilyushin IL-62M, registered UP-I6208. The aircraft entered service with Interflug on 1 June 1989 registered DDR-SEY. On 3 October 1990 it was re-registered D-AOAM, serving with Interflug until July 1991 when it was sold to Aeroflot and re-registered CCCP-86578. In January 1993 as a result of old Soviet Aeroflot assets splitting, it became part of the Uzbekistan Airways fleet and in March 1993 was re-registered UK-86578. In the early 2000s the aircraft was removed from service. In October 2007 it was leased to DETA Air of Kazakhstan, re-registered UN-86509 and then in July 2008 UP-I6208. It was leased to Aria Air in March 2009.

Accident

The accident happened at 18:10 Iran Daylight Time (13:40 UTC). The aircraft overran the runway at high speed and crashed outside the airport perimeter, the nose area totally destroyed and resting on its tail. There was no fire. Sixteen people were killed. Among the dead were thirteen crew members and three passengers including Aria CEO Mehdi Dadpay. There were 157 survivors of the total of 173 people on board.

The aircraft was reported to have skidded off the runway. The cockpit area of the aircraft was destroyed by the impact with the airport perimeter wall. Nineteen people were reported to have been injured in the accident. The weather was good at the time of the accident, with the METAR in force at the time reading "METAR OIMM 241300Z 08014KT CAVOK 34/M03 Q1012 A2989". The aircraft landed with a crosswind. It landed "long" and overran the end of the runway, hitting a wall located more than  further on, which demolished the forward section of the aircraft.

Cause 
Corrective action could have been taken, but the engine reverser and spoiler systems were not used correctly to reduce speed.

As a result of the accident, the Air Operators Certificate of Aria Air was suspended until the investigation ended.

See also 
TAM Airlines Flight 3054

References

External links
 Final Report – Iran Civil Aviation Organization
 Photo of UP-I6208
 Picture of the remains of the airliner after the crash

Aviation accidents and incidents in 2009
2009 in Iran
Aviation accidents and incidents in Iran
Accidents and incidents by airline of Iran
Accidents and incidents involving the Ilyushin Il-62
Mashhad
July 2009 events in Asia